School Attack 2018 is a South Korean television program that airs on SBS funE, with replays on SBS MTV and SBS Plus. This is a reboot of the popular Korean variety show School Attack, that was aired from July 2003 to January 2009.

Season 1 aired from June 25, 2018 to August 20, 2018 at every Monday 21:00 (KST). Season 2 will air from October 22, 2018 to November 12, 2018 on the same time slot, with GFriend's Yerin replacing Momoland's JooE as host.

A 2019 version of the show will be launching from mid-August.

Cast

Current
Eun Ji-won (Sechskies) (Season 1-2)
Son Dong-woon (Highlight) (Season 1-2)
Yerin (GFriend) (Season 2)

Former
JooE (Momoland) (Season 1)

Program

Season 1
Guerrilla Concert
LAN Cable Ripping Confession: Applicants invite someone he/she wants to relay their minds. After the invited listens to the applicant's confession, he/she can choose to either:
Open the barrier and enter the chatting window, then start to converse with the applicant, OR
Log out and not proceeding to converse
If the invited chose to converse with the applicant, they have to solve their problems through the conversation, and the invited then can choose to either accept or reject the applicant's request.
Classroom Attack: Each class is represented by their class representatives, and they will answer various questions regarding the 10s culture. The winning class will represent the school to challenge the Scholarship Mission.
Hope Dream Relay: The representing class has to finish a relay of 4 missions. If they can finish within 100 seconds, they will receive a scholarship of 5 million won.

Season 2
Self Life Memo Book: The guests will fill in their own profiles, and answer hypothetical questions.
Going To School Mission - Find the Hidden XXX!: The guests will have to split into groups to find hidden items in the Attack School. If they are caught by the students during the process, the guests will have to be punished.
Guerrilla Concert

Episodes

Season 1 (Semester 1)

Season 2 (Semester 2)

References

Notes

External links
 on Naver V Live

South Korean reality television series